The 2008–09 Serbian Cup season was the third season of the Serbian national football tournament. The competition started on 3 September 2008 and ended with the Final held on 21 May 2009. The defending champions were FK Partizan, who successfully defended their title.

Awards

Preliminary round
A preliminary round was held in order to reduce the number of teams competing in the next round to 32 and featured six teams from Serbian lower divisions. The matches were played on 3 September 2008.

|}
Note: Roman numerals in brackets denote the league tier the clubs participate in during the 2008–09 season.

Round of 32
In this round entered three winners from the previous round as well as all 12 teams from Serbian Superliga and several teams from Serbian second and third division. The matches were played on 24 September 2008.

|}
1The match was played in Šid.2The match was played in Zvečan.Note: Roman numerals in brackets denote the league tier the clubs participate in during the 2008–09 season.

Round of 16
The matches were played on 12 November 2008.

|}
Note: Roman numerals in brackets denote the league tier the clubs participate in during the 2008–09 season.

Quarter-finals

Note: Roman numerals in brackets denote the league tier the clubs participate in during the 2008–09 season.

Semi-finals

Note: Roman numerals in brackets denote the league tier the clubs participate in during the 2008–09 season.

Final

Note: Roman numerals in brackets denote the league tier the clubs participate in during the 2008–09 season.

External links
 Official page 
 Serbian Cup on rsssf.org
 LAV KUP: Đorđević odbranio "duplu krunu", MTS Mondo, May 21, 2009
 Partizan odbranio Kup!, B92, May 21, 2009

Serbian Cup seasons
Cup
Serbian Cup, 2008-09